A rainy day  or rainy day fund is a reserved amount of money to be used in times when regular income is disrupted or decreased in order for typical operations to continue. In the United States, the term is usually used to apply to the funds maintained by most U.S. states to help deal with budget shortfalls in years where revenues do not match expenditures. This is critical to the operations of most states, which do not permit their governments to take on debt, meaning that services would have to be cut in the absence of reserve funds. 

New York State Comptroller Thomas DiNapoli recommended in March 2010 that the state require that one half of surpluses be deposited into the rainy day fund.  The Massachusetts rainy day fund has been the focus of tussles between the Governor of Massachusetts and the Massachusetts General Court. Some research suggests developing a national rainy day fund for states might improve state credit ratings and reduce capital financing costs for states.

See also
Contingency fund
Emergency fund

References

External links
 Massachusetts 'Rainy Day' Stabilization Fund

Government budgets